Carolina Cynthia Vilches Fuenzalida (born 21 December 1984) is a Chilean activist who was elected as a member of the Chilean Constitutional Convention.

References

External links
 
 BCN Profile

Living people
1984 births
21st-century Chilean politicians
Members of the Chilean Constitutional Convention
Commons (political party) politicians
21st-century Chilean women politicians
University of Playa Ancha alumni